Abū ʿAbdallāh Muḥammad b. Maḥmūd b. al-Ḥasan b. Hibatallāh b. Maḥāsin al-Baghdādī, Muḥibb al-Dīn Ibn al-Najjār, commonly known as Ibn al-Najjār, was a Baghdadi Sunni scholar of the late Abbasid era. He is regarded as the leading muhaddith of his age and the leading authority on biographical history as well.

Biography

Early Life
Born into a modest family, he was son of the leader carpenter of the Dar al-Khilafah located in the Abbasid Palace of Baghdad. He lost his father at the age of 8 years old and his older brother Ali began raising him instead. Ali was a textile seller who had knowledge in calculation of inheritance, anecdotes, and history. Ibn al-Najjār studied the Hadith and the Qu'ran with the prominent scholars of Baghdad from three generations.

Travel and Return
When it was the year (606/1209 AD), and he reached twenty-eight years of age, his soul longed for the journey in seeking hadith, so he travelled to the Hejaz (Mecca & Medina), the Levant, Egypt, Khurasan, Herat, and Nishapur, hearing from its sheikhs, obtaining the foundations and chains, and realizing the high chains of transmission. Ibn al-Najjar had over 3000 teachers with 400 of his teachers being women. He was heard in every country he entered and the city he stayed in, and established himself to become the worlds most famous memorizer.

Then he returned to Baghdad, and he had intended since his youth to compose a history about it, so he used to follow up the news of its virtuous people and who entered it a lot, until it became famous for him, and history became the science that prevailed in it, then it was for him to leave again in seeking knowledge, so he departed to Isfahan for about a year (620 AH/1223 AD), then he returned from it to perform Hajj and perform Hajj in Makkah Al-Mukarramah, then he moved to Egypt, where he stayed for some time, then returned to Baghdad.

Teaching
When the Al-Mustansiriya School was opened in Baghdad in the year (630 AH/1233 AD), Ibn al-Najjar was appointed as a teacher of the science of hadith in it, and he was known for his humility, piety, and good delivery.

Death
His death was on Tuesday, the fifth of Sha’ban in the year (643 AH/1245 CE), and he was sixty-five years old. He was prayed at the Nizamiyya school, and his funeral was witnessed by many people, and it was called around his funeral: “This is the memorizer of the hadith of the Messenger of God, may God’s prayers and peace be upon him, who used to deny lying about it." He did not leave an heir, and his legacy was twenty dinars and the clothes of his body, and he bequeathed that they be given in alms, and the people praised him and inherited him with many inheritances, and he was buried in the tombs of the martyrs at Bab Harb in Baghdad.

Works

History
 The renewed history of the city of peace and the news of its virtues, the notables and those who received it among the notables, is his magnum opus coming in 30 volumes which is an appendix to the "History of Baghdad" by Al-Khatib Al-Baghdadi.
 Nuzha al-Wari fi Akhbar Umm al-Qura, a history compilation of Mecca.
 Al-Durrah al-Thaminah fi Akhbar al-Madinah, a history compilation of Medina.
 Manaqib Al-Shafi’i, a biography of Imam Shafi'i

Hadith
 Al-Qamar Al-Munir fi Al-Musnad Al-Kabir, in which he mentioned the Companions and the narrators, and what each of them had from the hadith.
 Kanz Al-Ayyam fi Ma’rifat Al-Sunan and Al-Ahkam
 The Different and Al-Moatalif, appendix to Ibn Makula
 The previous and the later
 The agreement and the intersection
 The book of titles
 The approach of injury in the knowledge of the companions
 Al-Kafi in the names of men
 Attribution of hadiths to fathers and countries
 Kitab Awaliah
 Kitab Mu’jam, the dictionary of his sheikhs (narrators).
 Paradise of the beholders in the knowledge of the followers
 Perfection in the knowledge of men

Literature
 Anwar Al-Zahr in the beauties of the poets of the era
 Al-Azhar fi types of poetry
 Nuzhat al-Tarf fi Akhbar Ahl al-Darf
 Gharar al-Fawa’id full of six volumes
 The only consolation 
 Telling the longing about the news of lovers
 Nashwar Al-Muhadara

See also 
 List of Ash'aris and Maturidis

References

1183 births
1246 deaths

Shafi'is
Asharis
Hadith scholars